A Time to Be Born may refer to

A Time to Be Born, a novel in the Star Trek: A Time to... series
A Time to Be Born, a novel by Dawn Powell
A Time to Be Born, a 2006 musical based on the Dawn Powell novel